St Giles' Church is a church in Blaston, Leicestershire. It is a Grade II listed building.

History
The current church was built in 1878, to the design of George Edmund Street, replacing an earlier church. It consists of a nave, chancel, bell-cote containing 1 bell and a south porch. There are 2 fonts, one of them dates to the time of the building of the church and the other one is earlier.

The nave has a painting of St Jerome on the north wall. It was painted by Decio Vilares in 1877. The Brazilian flag was also designed by a Décio Villares but, despite different spellings, it is unknown whether this is the same person. The nave's screens have 2 segments of stained glass.

References

Blaston
Blaston